Johnson County, Texas, has had many courthouses since it was formed.

Historical courthouses of Johnson County
The original courthouse was at Wardville. It is still in existence today at a park on the banks of Lake Pat Cleburne, though it suffered damage at the hands of arsonists in 2007. In 1856, the county seat was moved to Buchanan and a new courthouse was built, which survived until at least the mid-1860s. A two-story framed courthouse was planned but never constructed. When part of Johnson County was consolidated into Hood County the county seat was moved again, to "Camp Henderson" which was renamed Cleburne. The first building used was off the square proper of the town, at 2 North Caddo. A two-story brick courthouse was completed on October 26, 1879. In 1882, this one was razed and a new brick building was built which included a bell tower. Though it was brick, it shared styling with neighboring Hill County's courthouse. This was destroyed by fire on April 15, 1912.

Current courthouse
The current Prairie style structure was completed on November 28, 1913 and was renovated in 2006.

See also

National Register of Historic Places listings in Johnson County, Texas
Recorded Texas Historic Landmarks in Johnson County
List of county courthouses in Texas

References

Block, Viola. History of Johnson County and surrounding areas. Waco: Texian Press, 1970. Library of Congress 73-149378

External links

Buildings and structures in Cleburne, Texas
Buildings and structures in Johnson County, Texas
Clock towers in Texas
County courthouses in Texas
Government buildings on the National Register of Historic Places in Texas
National Register of Historic Places in Johnson County, Texas